Jaya Prakash Nagar is a metro station on the Green Line of the Namma Metro serving the J. P. Nagar area of Bangalore, India. It was opened to the public on 18 June 2017.

History

Station layout

Facilities

List of available ATM at Jayaprakash Nagar metro station are

Connections

Entry/exits

See also

References

External links

 Bangalore Metro Rail Corporation Ltd. (Official site) 
 UrbanRail.Net – descriptions of all metro systems in the world, each with a schematic map showing all stations.

Namma Metro stations
Railway stations in India opened in 2017
2017 establishments in Karnataka
Railway stations in Bangalore